Iorweth Clifford Jenkins (born 11 December 1959) is a Welsh retired professional footballer who played as a defender in the Football League for Brentford. He later dropped into non-League football and held managerial and coaching roles at a number of clubs and associations in Northamptonshire.

Club career 
A defender, Jenkins began his career in the youth system at Second Division club Chelsea and signed his first professional contract in 1978. He failed to make a senior appearance at Stamford Bridge and departed to join Third Division club Brentford in November 1979. Despite being signed by Bill Dodgin Jr., he failed to break into the team until the appointment of Fred Callaghan in April 1980. Jenkins made 17 appearances and scored one goal before departing Griffin Park in January 1981. He dropped into non-League football and joined Alliance Premier League club Kettering Town.

International career 
Jenkins represented Wales at schoolboy level.

Coaching & managerial career 
Jenkins held managerial roles at Northamptonshire non-League clubs Rushden Town, Wellingborough Town and Stewarts & Lloyds Corby. During the 2003–04 season, he managed the Northamptonshire FA representative youth team, before being appointed assistant manager at United Counties League First Division club Irchester United in June 2004. He quickly moved on to join Rothwell Town as reserve team manager the following month.

Personal life 
When he quit professional football in January 1981, Jenkins joined the Police. Jenkins' son Callum became a non-League footballer.

Career statistics

References

1959 births
Living people
Footballers from Neath
Welsh footballers
Brentford F.C. players
English Football League players
Chelsea F.C. players
Kettering Town F.C. players
National League (English football) players
Association football defenders
Desborough Town F.C. players
Rushden Town F.C. managers
Wellingborough Town F.C. managers
Stewarts & Lloyds Corby A.F.C. managers
Welsh football managers
Welsh police officers